Al Sadd Handball Team is the handball team of Al Sadd SC, based in the capital city of Doha, Qatar. It currently competes in the Qatar Handball League (QHL). The team is one of the most successful in all of Asia, winning the Asian Club League Handball Championship a record 5 times.

History
Al Sadd Handball Team was formed shortly after the formation of the club in 1969. Since then, they have dominated the handball scene in Qatar, winning a record number of domestic trophies. Their success hasn't been limited to local competitions, however. The team has won a record of 5 Asian Club League Handball Championship titles, meaning they have the most Asian titles to their name. In addition, they won the Handball Club World Cup in 2000. They have also won the IHF Super Globe in 2002 as the host team, as well as finishing runners-up in 2010, again as the host team.

Honours

Domestic
 Qatar Handball League
 Winners (9) : 1986, 1988, 1989, 1994, 1997, 2001, 2002, 2004, 2009
 Emir of Qatar Cup
 Winners (8) : 1997, 1999, 2002, 2004, 2005, 2006, 2007, 2013
 Qatar Crown Prince Cup
 Winners (7) : 2002, 2003, 2004, 2005, 2006, 2009, 2010

International
 GCC Club Handball Champions
 Winners : 2004, 2014, 2015
 Asian Handball Champions League
 Winners : 2000, 2001, 2002, 2003, 2005
 IHF Super Globe (Handball Club World Cup)
 Winners : 2002

Team

Managerial history
 Sufyan Druasi (2010–2011)
 Ahmed Deabes (2011–2012)
 Patrice Canayer (2012) (temp)
 Lakhdar Arrouche (2012–2013)
 Franjo Meter (2013–2014)

Notable players

Qatar
  Abdulla Al Ghamdi
  Nasser Al Turki
  Nasser Al Sadd
  Ghanim Al Ali
  Sid Kenaoui
Algeria
  Abdelkrim Bendjemil
Bosnia and Herzegovina
  Mirsad Terzić
  Benjamin Čičkušić
  Nikola Prce
Croatia
  Mirko Alilović
  Ivano Balić
  Petar Metličić
  Renato Sulić
  Mario Tomić
Denmark
  Lars Jørgensen
Germany
  Andrej Klimovets

Hungary
  Péter Gulyás
  Gergő Iváncsik
  Nikola Eklemović
  Carlos Pérez
Macedonia
  Kiril Lazarov
Romania
  Alin Șania
Serbia
  Marko Vujin
  Ratko Nikolić
  Dejan Perić
  Stefan Ilić
  Nenad Peruničić
Slovenia
  Renato Vugrinec
  Matevž Skok
  Borut Mačkovšek
Spain
  Eduardo Gurbindo
  Eduard Fernandez

Notable former coach
Montenegro
  Veselin Vujović

See also
Al Sadd Basketball Team

References

External links
Official website 

Qatari handball clubs
Handball clubs established in 1969
1969 establishments in Qatar
Sports clubs in Doha